Calata is the name of the following persons:

 Fort Calata (1956-1985), South African politician
 James Calata (1895–1983), South African politician
 Joseph Calata (born 1980), Filipino businessman

Călata is the name of these geographical denominations:

 Călata, a tributary of the Crișul Repede in Cluj County, Romania
 Călata, a village in Călățele Commune, Cluj County, Romania

Other meanings:

 Comitia Calata was an assembly for religious purposes in ancient Rome